Kateřina Heková (born May 18, 1976 in Hradec Králové) is a Czech sprint canoer who competed in the mid-1990s. She was eliminated in the semifinals of the K-4 500 m event at the 1996 Summer Olympics in Atlanta.

References
 Sports-Reference.com profile

1976 births
Canoeists at the 1996 Summer Olympics
Czech female canoeists
Living people
Olympic canoeists of the Czech Republic
Sportspeople from Hradec Králové